The Journal of Forecasting is a peer-reviewed academic journal published eight times per year by John Wiley & Sons. The journal was established in 1982 and covers all aspects of forecasting, including subject areas such as statistics, economics, psychology, systems engineering, and social sciences.

According to the Journal Citation Reports, the journal has a 2020 impact factor of 2.306, ranking it 164th out of 378 journals in the category "Economics" and 176th out of 226 journals in the category "Management".

References

External links 
 

Wiley (publisher) academic journals
English-language journals
Publications established in 1982
Business and management journals